Benjamas Sangaram (born 11 January 1975) is a former professional tennis player from Thailand. She represented Thailand at three Olympic Games, in 1992, 1996 and 2000.

Biography
Born in Chiang Mai, Sangaram first played for the Thailand Fed Cup team as a 16-year old in 1991. She appeared in a total of 21 ties during her Fed Cup career, mostly as a doubles player.

She debuted on the WTA Tour in 1992 at her home event, the Thailand Open, which she competed in regularly throughout her career. Most of her main draw singles appearances were at the Thailand Open but she also made the second round at Surabaya in 1995. It was in doubles that she had the most success, reaching a best ranking of 134 in the world.

Partnering Tamarine Tanasugarn, Sangaram made the women's doubles quarter-finals at both the 1996 and 2000 Summer Olympics. At the 2000 Olympics in Sydney the pair upset Japanese fourth seeds Nana Miyagi and Ai Sugiyama from Japan, then in the quarter-finals held a match point, before losing to eventual silver medalists Kristie Boogert and Miriam Oremans from the Netherlands.

ITF finals

Singles (1–0)

Doubles (9–7)

References

External links
 
 
 

1975 births
Living people
Benjamas Sangaram
Benjamas Sangaram
Tennis players at the 1992 Summer Olympics
Tennis players at the 1996 Summer Olympics
Tennis players at the 2000 Summer Olympics
Southeast Asian Games medalists in tennis
Benjamas Sangaram
Benjamas Sangaram
Benjamas Sangaram
Tennis players at the 1998 Asian Games
Benjamas Sangaram
Competitors at the 1991 Southeast Asian Games
Benjamas Sangaram
Benjamas Sangaram